The following is a list of mayors of the city of Canoas, in the state of Rio Grande do Sul, Brazil.

 Edgar Braga da Fontoura, 1940-1941 	
 Júlio Cardoso de Araújo, 1941	
 Aluízio Palmeiro de Escobar, 1941-1945	
 Nelson Paim Terra, 1945-1951	
 Paulo Ribeiro, 1945	
 José João de Medeiros, 1951	
 Arthur Pereira de Vargas, 1951	
 Sady Fontoura Schivitz, 1952-1955	
 , 1956-1959	
 José João de Medeiros, 1960-1963	
 , 1964-1971, 1983-1984, 1989-1992, 1997-2000 
 Daniel Cruz da Costa, 1971-1973	
 , 1973-1978, 1978-1979
 Luiz Jeronymo Busato, 1978		
 Oswaldo Cypriano Guindani, 1979-1983 
 Ney de Moura Calixto, 1983	
 Cláudio Bloedow Schultz, 1984-1985	
 Francisco Biazus, 1985	
 , 1986-1988		
 Liberty Dick Conter, 1993-1996 		
 , 2001-2008	
 , 2009-2016	
 , 2017-2021

See also
 
 
 List of mayors of largest cities in Brazil (in Portuguese)

References

This article incorporates information from the Portuguese Wikipedia.

canoas
Canoas